El Súper Clásico (English: The Super Classic), also known as El Clásico (English: The Classic), and El Clásico de Clásicos (English: The Classic of Classics), is an association football match between Mexican clubs Club América and Guadalajara. It is considered the biggest rivalry in Mexican football, and one of the biggest in world football.

Both teams are the two most successful in Mexican football in terms of championships, with Club América winning 13 league titles and Chivas trailing them with 12. They are also known for their extensive fan bases throughout Mexico and the United States, and are both the most popular teams. The clubs are also uniquely identified by their histories; Club América is considered the club of the wealthy and establishment, as they are known for signing Mexican and foreign players, as well as the fact that they are located in Mexico City and are owned by media conglomerate Televisa, while Guadalajara are known for exclusively fielding Mexican players, the only club in the country to do so. 

As of 18 March 2023, Club América leads the all-time head-to-head results between the two with 86 wins to Guadalajara's 82, with 79 matches ending in a draw.

History
The first confrontation between what are considered the two most popular teams in Mexico ended with a victory for Guadalajara with a score of 1–0. The rivalry began to flourish after the second match, when Chivas defeated Club América with a score of 7–2 In the year of 1943. Although the huge defeat sparked embarrassment within the ranks of Club América, it was almost two decades before the rivalry became the Clásico that is known today. Initially, Club América was struggling in the Mexican League. Halfway through the 1957–58 tournament, Club América had only managed to win six points, placing them in last place in the overall standings. In danger of finishing lower in the standings, the club hired Fernando Marcos, a retired player and referee. By the 1958–59 tournament, Marcos had transformed the team into a contender for the title. Although Club América 's level rose, Chivas was playing tactical football that was giving them good results. After the 1957–1958 tournament, in which Club Zacatepec was crowned champions, Chivas managed to win a record six consecutive titles.

The late 1950s through the mid-1960s could be considered the best era in Chivas' history. During this time period, Chivas won the majority (7) of their eleven league titles, only interrupted twice in 1958 and 1963, by Zacatepec and Club Deportivo Oro respectively. Although Club América , or any other Mexican club for that matter, never achieved the same success in such a short period of time, an equally impressive feat is achieved much later by Club América.

Mexican football had drastically evolved by the 1980s. The period of football domination between two teams was certainly over. Although absolute parity is never achievable, competition was more evenly distributed throughout the football clubs competing in the México Primera División. The 1980s is perhaps the best decade in Club América's history. Up until then, no other club had managed the incredible success of Chivas. During this time period, Club América won five titles in the course of five years. First, starting in 1984, a series of three consecutive titles, followed by two consecutive titles starting in 1988. Club América achieved what no other team has achieved in present-era Mexican football. Despite consistency from both Chivas and Club América , after Club América's glorious years and long after Chivas' golden age, the two teams have only managed to win four titles between them, two apiece.

Riot of 1983
In the second leg of the semi-finals of the 1982–83 season, players of both two teams sparked a brawl better known as "La Bronca del '83" ("The Riot of '83"), which resulted in Chivas going onto play Puebla in the final by eliminating Club América during that playoff.

The following season Club América would get to play Chivas once again in the 1983–1984 final in which Club América came from behind on aggregate to defeat Chivas in to date the only final disputed between the two teams.

In between the seasons of 1983 through the year 2000, Club América showed dominance over Chivas recording an impressive record of only 6 losses out of 43 matches against Chivas.

2000s
One of the most memorable games played between Chivas and Club América during the Clausura 2005 tournament took place on 13 March in the Estadio Azteca. The game started with a goal by Pável Pardo at the 15th minute of the game. Club América would then attempt to solidify its hold on the game when, in the 38th minute, Óscar Rojas scored the second goal, capitalizing on a pass from Cuauhtémoc Blanco. During the 42nd minute of the game, with the first half about to conclude, Héctor Reynoso scored one of the most beautiful goals of his career, making the score 2–1. Francisco Palencia would score the 100th goal of his career in the 58th minute, tying the score 2–2. But Club América would again take the lead when, at the 78th minute, Pável Pardo made an excellent pass to Claudio López who didn't waste the opportunity to penetrate the gaping goal tended by Oswaldo Sánchez. However, things wouldn't end there. Three minutes before the game ended, Palencia would make his 101st goal as a result of a magnificent play involving Ramón Morales and Alberto Medina. The score was tied 3–3 although Chivas attempted yet another goal that came from Palencia.

In 2007, Club América set the record for most wins in a year by defeating Chivas four times.

In 2016, Club América and Guadalajara met a record seven times between league matches (including play-offs) and their semifinal Copa MX meeting. Club América came out ahead with a note-worthy record of three victories, two draws and two defeats. In the two playoff-round meetings, Club América went undefeated against Guadalajara, with a record of two victories and two draws.

Overall statistics

Head-to-head

Club América at home

Guadalajara at home

Liguilla matches

Refereeing
The record holders for matches refereeing the matches belonging to Marco Antonio Rodríguez and Armando Archundia with 
 Marco Rodríguez (5)
Armando Archundia (4)
 German Arredondo (3)
 Mauricio Morales (2)
 Francisco Chacon (2)
 Gilberto Alcala (2)
 Erim Ramirez Ulloa (2)
 Fernando Guerrero Ramirez (2)
 Paul Delgadillo (1)
 Hugo Guajardo (1)
 Jorge Antonio Perez Duran (1)
 Jose Alfredo Penaloza Soto (1)
 Cesar Arturo Ramos Palazuelos (1)

Players that played for both teams

A listing of the many footballers who have played for both Guadalajara and Club America :

Note: On May 26, 2013, Francisco Javier Rodriguez became the first player ever in the history of Mexican football to champion with both teams. First having championed with Chivas on December 10, 2006.

 Salvador Mota – with Club América: 1942–1944 / with Guadalajara: 1944–48 ?

 Carlos Iturralde – with Guadalajara: 1950–1951 / with America: 1952–1956

 Eduardo Garduño – with Club América: 1947–1949 / with Guadalajara: 1954–1955

 Raul Cardenas – with Club América: 1959–1960 / with Guadalajara: 1967–1968

 Ramiro Navarro – with Guadalajara: 1965–1968 / with Club América: 1968–69

 Sergio Ceballos – with Club América: 1968–1974 / with Guadalajara: 1976–1977

 Enrique Vázquez del Mercado – with Guadalajara: 1969–1972 / with Club América: 1969–1970

 Ruben Cardenas – with Club América: 1970–1973 / with Guadalajara: 1974–1980

 Antonio Zamora – with Club América: 1970–1973 / with Guadalajara: 1975–1978

 Francisco Macedo – with Club América: 1971–1973 / with Guadalajara: 1973–1974

 Albino Morales – with Club América: 1972–1973 / with Guadalajara: 1973–74

 Javier Sánchez Galindo – with Guadalajara: 1974–1975 / with Club América: 1975–1979

 Javier Cárdenas – with Club América: 1978–1979 / with Guadalajara: 1979–1985

 Javier Aguirre – with Club América: 1979–1984 / with Guadalajara: 1987–1993

 Carlos Hermosillo – with Club América: 1st run in 1983–1989, 2nd run in 1999–2000 / with Guadalajara: 2001

 Ricardo Peláez – with Club América: 1st run in 1985–1987, 2nd run in 1997–1998 / with Guadalajara: 1998–2000

 Luis Manuel Diaz – with Guadalajara: 1983–1987 / with Club América: 1991–1992

 Pedro Pineda – with Guadalajara: 1991–1992 / with Club América: 1st run in 1992–1995, 2nd run in 1996–1997

 Gerardo Silva – with Guadalajara: 1990–1993 / with Club América: 1993–1994

 Luis García – with Club América: 1995–1997 / with Guadalajara: 1998–1999

 Oswaldo Sánchez – with Club América: 1996–1999 / with Guadalajara: 1999–2006

 Ignacio Hierro – with Club América: 1997–1999 / with Guadalajara: 1999–2000

 Damián Álvarez – with Guadalajara: 1998 / with Club América: 1998–2000

 Gustavo Napoles – with Guadalajara: 1st run 1995–1998, 2nd run 2000–2002 / with Club América: 1999

 Ramón Ramírez – with Guadalajara: 1st run 1994–1998, 2nd run 2002–2004 / with Club América: 1999

 Joel Sánchez – with Guadalajara: 1st run 1993–1999, 2nd run 2001–2003 / with Club América: 1999–2000

 Jesús Mendoza – with Guadalajara: 1999–2000 / with Club América: 1st run 2000–2002, 2nd run 2003–2005

 Manuel Rios – with Guadalajara: 1998–2000 / with Club América: 2002

 Alejandro Nava – with Guadalajara: 1st run 2000, 2nd run 2001–2002 / with Club América: 2002

 Alvaro Ortiz – with Guadalajara: 1999–2000 / with Club América: 2002–2005

 Christian Ramírez – with Club América: 2003–2004 / with Guadalajara: 2005–2006

 Oribe Peralta ** – with Guadalajara: 2005 (loan), 2019–present / with Club América: 2014–2019

 Edoardo Isella – with Guadalajara: 2000–2001 / with Club América: 2008

 Luis Alonso Sandoval – with Guadalajara: 2002–2005 / with AmClub Américarica: 2010

 Luis Ernesto Perez ** – with Club América: 2007 (loan) / with Guadalajara: 2012–2016

 Rafael Marquez Lugo – with Club América: 2008 / with Guadalajara: 2012–2015

 Francisco Javier Rodriguez  – with  Guadalajara: 2002–2008 / with  Club América: 2013–2014

 Ángel Reyna – with Club América: 2009–2011 / with Guadalajara: 2014–2015

 Alberto García Carpizo – with Guadalajara: 2014–2015 / with Club América: 2015

 Jesús Molina – 
with Club América: 2011–2014 / with Guadalajara: 2019

 Fernando Rubén González – with Guadalajara: 2013–2015 / with Club América: 2019–2020

 José Madueña – with Club América: 2014-2015 / with Guadalajara: 2020

 Alejandro Zendejas - with Guadalajara: 2016–2018 / with Club América: 2022–

Other special notes **
In the cases of Oribe Peralta and Luis Ernesto Perez, Peralta then a player of CF Monterrey was out on loan to Guadalajara for the 2005 edition of the Copa Libertadores playing in four matches. He did not score a single goal. In May 2014, Peralta was transferred from Santos Laguna to Club América. The same happened with Luis Ernesto Perez in 2007, Perez was then a player for CF Monterrey but was loaned to Club América for that year's edition of the Copa Libertadores.

In the case of Ángel Reyna, Reyna was suspended from Chivas' A squad in September 2015 due to disputes. With the firing of Jose Manuel de la Torre of whom Reyna had feuded with for some time and with the coming of Matias Almeyda, Reyna was left out of training sessions and coming matches. Reyna's contract with Chivas was officially terminated on March 9, 2016.

Managers
Several managers have led on both squads. Walter Ormeño and Oscar Ruggeri played for Club América and later managed rival Guadalajara. Luis Fernando Tena served Guadalajara as player in 1983 and later managed Club América in 2006-07. He then replaces Tomás Boy at Guadalajara in September 2019. Ricardo La Volpe (**) is the only manager to have served both squads in more than one occasion. Ignacio Ambríz became the first Mexican manager to lead in both.

 Walter Ormeño – Club América (1969–1970); Guadalajara (1972–1973)

 Miguel Ángel López – Club América (1984–1987 & 1992–1993); Guadalajara (1989–1991)

 Carlos Miloc – Guadalajara (1979–1980); Club América (1991)

 Ricardo La Volpe ** – Guadalajara (1989 & 2014); Club América (1996 & 2016–2017)

 Leo Beenhakker – Club América (1994–1995 & 2003–2004); Guadalajara (1996)

 Oscar Ruggeri – Guadalajara (2001–2002); Club América (2004)

 Ignacio Ambríz – Guadalajara (2012); Club América (2015–2016)

 Luis Fernando Tena - Club América (2006-2007); Guadalajara (2019-2020)

References

 El Clásico de Clásicos Club América vs Chivas
 Esmas Futbol
 http://espndeportes.espn.go.com/news/story?id=1498160&s=mex&type=story
 https://web.archive.org/web/20140407065328/http://hoy-deportes.com/chivas-vs-america.html

Football rivalries in Mexico
Club América
C.D. Guadalajara
1943 establishments in Mexico
Nicknamed sporting events